Neda Bahi (born 1 January 1992) is a Paralympic athlete from Tunisia competing mainly in category T37 sprint events.

Achievements
She competed in the 2012 Summer Paralympics in London, UK.  There she won a gold medal in Women's 400 metres - T37 event.

In 2013 IPC Athletics World Championships in Lyon, Neda Bahi won a silver medal in Women's 400 metres - T37 event.

References

External links 
 

1992 births
Living people
Tunisian female sprinters
Paralympic athletes of Tunisia
Paralympic gold medalists for Tunisia
Paralympic silver medalists for Tunisia
Paralympic bronze medalists for Tunisia
Athletes (track and field) at the 2004 Summer Paralympics
Athletes (track and field) at the 2008 Summer Paralympics
Athletes (track and field) at the 2012 Summer Paralympics
Medalists at the 2012 Summer Paralympics
African Games silver medalists for Tunisia
African Games medalists in athletics (track and field)
Athletes (track and field) at the 2015 African Games
Paralympic medalists in athletics (track and field)
21st-century Tunisian women